The Nelson Mandela African Institution of Science and Technology (NM-AIST) is a public institution in northern Tanzania based in Arusha City.

Institution
The Nelson Mandela African Institution of Science and Technology in Arusha (NM-AIST Arusha) is part of the network of Pan-African Institutes of Science and Technology located across the continent. 

The NM-AIST Arusha, which is accredited by the Tanzania Commission for Universities (TCU), is being developed into a research intensive institution for postgraduate and postdoctoral studies and research in Science, Engineering and Technology (SET). 

The training in SET, however, incorporates appreciable doses of relevant humanities and business studies ingredients. Life sciences and bio-engineering are being developed to become specializations of the NM-AIST Arusha due to the biodiversity in the region. The institution seeks to stimulate, catalyze and promote intensification of agricultural production. 

Value addition to the various natural products (agricultural, mineral, etc.) produced in Tanzania and the Eastern African region is also a primary focus. Other main thematic areas covered by NM-AIST Arusha include Energy, ICT, Mining, Environment and Water.

See also
 African University of Science and Technology
 Nelson Mandela Institution

References

External links
 
 Institutional Profile

Public universities in Tanzania
Universities in Arusha
Educational institutions established in 2010
2010 establishments in Tanzania